"First Time" is a song by Australian alternative rock band Jebediah. It was released in May 2004 as the lead single from the band's fourth studio album, Braxton Hicks and reached number 50 on the Australian ARIA Singles Charts.

Redline Records
The single was the first release following the band's departure from the Murmur label (a subsidiary of Sony Music), and was the first independently released Jebediah recording.

Music video
The music video for the single was filmed in Melbourne, Australia, and features all four band members alongside performers in large animal costumes.

Additional tracks
The additional track on the CD single, "Worlds Away", became the theme song for the television series, Lockie Leonard.

Track listing

"First Time" 
"Worlds Away"  (Matt Lovell Mix)
"Sound of Your Life"
"Dog"

Charts

References

2004 singles
Jebediah songs
2004 songs
Songs written by Kevin Mitchell (musician)